"Neva End" is a song by American hip-hop recording artist Future from his debut studio album Pluto. The hip hop and pop song was produced by Mike Will Made It, and on December 4, 2012, it was released as the fifth official single from Pluto.  The single version features an additional verse by American singer-songwriter Kelly Rowland, and was included in the 2012 re-release of Pluto, titled Pluto 3D.

Background and release
"Neva End" was originally written by Nayvadius Wilburn, Michael Williams and Pierre Ramon Slaughter.  It was produced by Mike Will Made It and was featured on his debut studio album Pluto. The song was officially remixed featuring a guest appearance from American singer Kelly Rowland and was released as the lead single for his re-release, Pluto 3D. Future premiered the song on October 16, 2012, and it was sent to rhythmic radio on December 4, 2012.

Music video
The music video was filmed in November 2012. On November 21, 2012, the music video for "Neva End" premiered on 106 & Park. The music video was directed by Erik White, and it was shot in Los Angeles. The house the visual was shot in used to belong to American singer Madonna.

Live performances
On November 27, 2012, Future performed the song along with Kelly Rowland on Jimmy Kimmel Live!.

Chart performance
Neva End peaked at number 52 on US Billboard Hot 100 chart and spent a total of 20 weeks on the chart. The single also peaked at number 14 on the US Hot R&B/Hip-Hop Songs and number 11 on the US Hot Rap Songs charts.

Certifications

Charts

Weekly charts

Year-end charts

Release history

References

External links
Music video for "Neva End" at YouTube

2012 songs
Future (rapper) songs
Music videos directed by Erik White
Song recordings produced by Mike Will Made It
Songs written by Theron Thomas
Songs written by Timothy Thomas
Songs written by Kelly Rowland
Epic Records singles
2012 singles
Songs written by Future (rapper)
Songs written by Pierre Ramon Slaughter